USS Doyen (DD-280) was a  built for the United States Navy during World War I.

Description
The Clemson class was a repeat of the preceding  although more fuel capacity was added. They had a crew of 6 officers and 108 enlisted men.

Performance differed radically between the ships of the class, often due to poor workmanship. The Clemson class was powered by two steam turbines, each driving one propeller shaft, using steam provided by four water-tube boilers.

The ships were armed with four 4-inch (102 mm) guns in single mounts and were fitted with two  1-pounder guns for anti-aircraft defense. In many ships a shortage of 1-pounders caused them to be replaced by 3-inch (76 mm) guns. Their primary weapon, though, was their torpedo battery of a dozen 21 inch (533 mm) torpedo tubes in four triple mounts. They also carried a pair of depth charge rails. A "Y-gun" depth charge thrower was added to many ships.

Construction and career
Doyen, named for Charles A. Doyen, was launched 26 July 1919 by Bethlehem Shipbuilding Corporation, Squantum, Massachusetts; sponsored by Miss F. E. Doyen, daughter of Brigadier General Doyen; and commissioned 17 December 1919. Doyen arrived at San Diego, California 15 March 1920 to join the Pacific Fleet in local operations. Placed in active reserve status 17 August, she participated in local exercises and reserve training until placed out of commission 8 June 1922.

Doyen was recommissioned 26 September 1923 and resumed a schedule of training and tactical exercises along the west coast, in the Panama Canal Zone, and the Hawaiian Islands. She sailed from San Diego 20 August to escort HIJMS Tama and to provide radio compass and communication for a nonstop west coast-to-Hawaii flight. Exercises were again conducted in the Canal Zone and the Caribbean in 1926, and later that year Doyen cruised to Bremerton, Washington for overhaul and to Ketchikan, Alaska, and Duncan Bay, British Columbia, for visits.

Doyen sailed 26 April 1927 for the east coast to participate in joint Army-Navy maneuvers at Newport, Rhode Island. She returned to the west coast 25 June and resumed training operations and tactical exercises with the Battle Fleet on the west coast, out of Pearl Harbor and in the Canal Zone. Doyen was decommissioned 25 February 1930 and scrapped 20 December 1930 in accordance with the London Naval Treaty for the limitation of naval armaments.

Notes

References

External links
http://www.navsource.org/archives/05/280.htm

 

Clemson-class destroyers
Ships built in Quincy, Massachusetts
1919 ships